Michelle Leech  is the Deputy Dean of Medicine at Monash University and an academic clinician-scientist. Leech oversees the delivery of the Monash medical program and maintains an active research profile and clinical practice as a rheumatologist.

Education 
Leech graduated with a Bachelor of Medicine and Bachelor of Surgery (Hons) from Monash University in 1987. She went onto residency training in internal medicine at Prince Henry’s Hospital and advanced physician training in rheumatology at Monash Health. Leech completed her PhD at Monash University’s Centre for Inflammatory Diseases and the Fellow of the Royal Australasian College of Physicians training program in 2000.

Career

Clinical 
Leech is a consultant physician and currently serves as Head of the Rheumatoid Arthritis Clinic at Monash Health.
In 2014, Leech was the Medical Director of Arthritis Australia. She has served on a number of National Rheumatology Advisory Boards, including Janssen-Cilag, Novartis, Abbvie, UCB, Cortical and MSD.

Research 
Leech is part of the rheumatology research group in the School of Clinical Sciences at Monash Health.
Her research interests are focused on cytokine biology, glucocorticoid action and cell cycle proteins in the context of Rheumatoid arthritis (RA) pathogenesis. She also maintains an active research profile in medical and interprofessional education.
Leech has published over 70 peer-reviewed papers, . Her most cited papers are: 

Leech M, Metz C, Hall P, Hutchinson P, Gianis K, Smith M, Weedon H, Holdsworth SR, Bucala R, Morand EF. Macrophage migration inhibitory factor in rheumatoid arthritis: evidence of proinflammatory function and regulation by glucocorticoids. Arthritis & Rheumatism:   . 1999 Aug;42(8):1601-8.  According to Google Scholar , it has been cited 388 times. 
Morand EF, Leech M, Bernhagen J. MIF: a new cytokine link between rheumatoid arthritis and atherosclerosis. Nature reviews Drug discovery. 2006 May;5(5):399-411. According to Google Scholar, this article has been cited 375 times
Leech M, Metz C, Santos L, Peng T, Holdsworth SR, Bucala R, Morand EF. Involvement of macrophage migration inhibitory factor in the evolution of rat adjuvant arthritis. Arthritis & Rheumatism: y. 1998 May;41(5):910-7.According to Google Scholar, this article has been cited 222 times

Administration 
Leech is currently a Deputy Dean in the Faculty of Medicine at Monash University, Nursing and Health Sciences.. Prior to this appointment, Leech was director of the undergraduate medical program at Southern Clinical School (now the School of Clinical Sciences at Monash Health). Other appointments include Deputy Chairperson, Postgraduate Medical Council of Victoria, Vice President, Medical Deans Australia and New Zealand, and member of the Scientific Advisory Committee, Arthritis Australia

In 2010, Leech received funding from the Department of Health and Ageing to develop interprofessional learning opportunities at Monash University and Southern Health (now Monash Health).

In 2017, Monash University’s medical program moved from a Bachelor of Medical Science and Bachelor of Surgery (MBBS) to a Doctor of Medicine (MD) under Leech’s leadership.
Leech also serves on the Royal Australasian College of Physicians examination panel.

Honours, awards and distinctions 
Australian Medical Students’ Association, National Teaching Award, 2012

References 

Academic staff of Monash University
Monash University alumni
Australian rheumatologists
Honorary Members of the Order of Australia
Fellows of the Royal Australasian College of Physicians
Year of birth missing (living people)
Living people
Women rheumatologists
21st-century women physicians